The Akaflieg Braunschweig SB-13 Arcus was an experimental tailless, single seat, Standard Class glider designed and built in Germany in the early 1990s. Though it performed as well as its conventional contemporaries, it did not offer sufficiently improved performance to compensate for its difficult handling characteristics.

Design and development
The Akaflieg Braunschweig or Akademische Fliegergruppe Braunschweig is one of some fourteen German undergraduate student flying groups attached to and supported by their home Technical University.  Several have designed and built aircraft, often technically advanced and leading the development of gliders in particular.  In 1982 when the SB-13 design was first discussed no new tailless glider had been built for thirty years, during which time glass reinforced plastic materials had replaced wood in glider construction and much learned about laminar flow wings; it was hoped that tailless designs would be lighter, simpler and cheaper.

Work on the SB-13 Arcus, named after the cloud formation, began in 1982. Because of the novelty of the layout, a one-third scale model of the early design was built and flown, revealing several serious problems.  Strong flutter was experienced even at modest speed and the aircraft was very sensitive to the centre of gravity (c.g.) position. It stalled readily when this was too far aft.  Recovery from the spin that followed was difficult.  With the c.g. too far forward, a rapid longitudinal "pecking" oscillation set in which, because of its short period, was hard to control.  Major redesign, involving long and difficult computer analysis led to a new wing with carbon fibre stiffening on the main spar; in addition, both it and the wing plan were made curved.  The new structure resisted flutter until  was reached.

The full scale SB-13 finally flew in 1988. Its  wing was straight edged, with three slightly tapered sections of increasing sweep. All had a dihedral of 4°. Elevons occupied much of the outer panel trailing edge and, further inboard, mid-chord mounted airbrakes were fitted. The fuselage, onto which the wings were mounted between low and mid position was a short pod with its nose a little ahead of the centre section leading edge, extending aft about as far as the trailing horizontal edge of the wing at its tip. The pilot reclined under a long, bulged, single piece canopy, which was side hinged to starboard. The cockpit reached beyond the wing both forward and aft, with the main spar passing through it under the pilot's knees.

Despite the modifications made to remove the handling problems predicted by the model, the full scale SB-13 still "pecked" and spun readily; when the standard spin correction procedure was applied, a new spin started in the opposite direction.  Over the next few years several aerodynamic devices were tried, some of which at least improved the behaviour of the Arcus; one longer-lasting outcome from the project was the start of an investigation into whole aircraft rescue parachutes.  The competition performance of the Arcus was on a par with that of other 15 m gliders of the time but it did not offer the great improvement over them which might have justified even more effort to improve the handling.

Operational history
The sole SB-13 was flown, modified and studied from 1988 to 2000, when it was damaged and set aside in favour of newer aircraft.  In 2007 it went to the Deutsches Museum, Munich for exhibition.

Aircraft on display
 SB-13 D-1113 is on display in the Deutsches Museum Flugwerft Schleissheim.

Specifications

References

External links

Tailless aircraft
1980s German sailplanes
Akaflieg Braunschweig aircraft
Aircraft first flown in 2000